James Atherton (1875–1923) was an English footballer who played in the Football League for Preston North End.

References

1875 births
1923 deaths
English footballers
Association football forwards
English Football League players
South Shore F.C. players
Wigan County F.C. players
Preston North End F.C. players
Southport F.C. players